The Negro Problem can refer to:

The Negro Problem Solved, an 1864 book by Hollis Read
The Negro Problem, an 1884 article by Nathaniel Shaler published in the Atlantic Monthly
The Negro Problem, an 1891 book by William Cabell Bruce
The Negro Problem (book), a 1903 collection of essays by Black American writers including W. E. B. DuBois and Paul Laurence Dunbar, edited by Booker T. Washington
The Negro Problem, a band led by Stew (musician), named after Washington's book

See also
The Study of the Negro Problems, an 1898 essay by W. E. B DuBois
An American Dilemma, subtitled The Negro Problem and Modern Democracy, a 1944 study of race relations